Dorodoca chrysaula is a moth in the family Cosmopterigidae. It is found on New Ireland.

References

Natural History Museum Lepidoptera generic names catalog

Cosmopteriginae